Mikael Leonovich Tariverdiev (15 August 1931 – 25 July 1996) was a prominent Soviet composer of Armenian descent. He headed the Composers' Guild of the Soviet Cinematographers' Union from its inception and is most famous for his movie scores, primarily the score to Seventeen Moments of Spring.

Biography

Mikael Tariverdiev was born in Tbilisi, Georgian SSR to Armenian parents, but lived and worked in Russia. His father, Levon Tariverdiev, was from Baku but a native of Nagorno-Karabakh. His mother, Satenik, was Georgian Armenian. He studied at the Komitas State Conservatory of Yerevan for two years and then graduated from the Moscow Gnessin Institute in the class of Aram Khachaturian in 1957.

Tariverdiev wrote over 100 romances and four operas, including the comic opera Count Cagliostro and the mono-opera "The Waiting". However, he is mostly known for his scores to many popular Soviet movies (more than 130 in total), including "Seventeen Moments of Spring" and "The Irony of Fate"—see List of film music by Mikael Tariverdiev.

He received many awards, including the USSR State Prize in 1977 and the Prize of the American Music Academy in 1975. In 1986 he was awarded the title of People's Artist of Russia. In 1990, he won three Nika Awards for Best Composer.

The Best Music prize at the largest Russian National Film Festival Kinotaur is named after Tariverdiev.

On May 31, 1990, Tariverdiev underwent cardiac surgery in the London Royal Hospital; his aortic valve was replaced with an artificial one.  Upon his death in 1996, a group of admirers of his music founded the Mikael Tariverdiev Charity Fund and organized the Tariverdiev International Organ Competition.

In November 2015, the first major release of Tariverdiev's work in the West was published in London by Antique Beat and the UK label Earth Recordings, as a set of three albums titled 'Film Music'. The release was curated by Vera Tariverdieva, the composer's widow, and Stephen Coates of the UK band The Real Tuesday Weld, who had heard Tariverdiev's music in Moscow in 2011.

Discography
The following works of Tariverdiev have been recorded:
Night Pastimes (film music)
Quo vadis? (Organ Symphony Chernobyl, 1st Organ Concerto Cassandra, Two Chorale Preludes) 
Moods (6 preludes from the cycle 10 chorale preludes imitating the old masters, 3rd Organ concerto, 10 preludes from the cycle Moods (organ transcription by Alexey Parchine)) 
Remembering Venice (film music)
Seventeen Moments of Spring (film music)
I Am The Tree (monologues on Posenyan, Voznesensky, Svetlov, Ashkenazy poetry sung by author) 
Instrumentalnye kinokhity (Film Music Hits)
Composer's interpretation of Jewish songs
Prescience of love (20th Century Madrigals)
Graf Cagliostro (opera comique)
Mikael Tariverdiev's  Avant-Garde (vocal cycles on Japan medieval poetry, Bella Akhmadulina, Leonid Martynov, Semen Kirsanov, Mikhail Malishevsky)
Nostalgia - Japan duo Hide-Hide performing Mikael Tariverdiev's music on classical Japanese instruments—semisen  and siakuhkati  with orchestra.
Vox Humana. Vocal cycles  to verses by L. Martinov, B. Akhmadulina, Medieval Japanese poets “Watercolors”, E. Vinokurov, M. Tsvetaeva, “Waiting” to the poem by R. Rojdestvenskie. Performers: Zara Dolukhanova (soprano), Nina Lebedeva  (soprano), Maria Lemesheva (soprano), Nina Svetlanova (piano), Mikael Tariverdiev (piano), Orchestra of Boris Pokrovsky Chamber Music Theater  (conductor – Vladimir Agronsky).

List of compositions
Symphonic works
1956 Concerto for voice with orchestra
The orchestra: 3,2,3(B.I-bass-cl); 4,3,3,1; kettledrums, triangle, side drum, cymbals, bass drum, tam-tam, piano, harp, voice, strings.
1982 Concerto No. 1 for violin with orchestra in three movements
The first version for full symphonic orchestra: 
The orchestra: 2,2,2,(B); 0; 2(C), 2(C),2,0; kettledrums, cymbals, triangle, side drum, tam-tam, tambourine, vibraphone, (xylophone), harpsichord, harp, violin-solo, strings 
The second version - for chamber orchestra: 
The orchestra: 1,0,0,0; 0,0,0,0; kettledrums, vibraphone, (xylophone), harpsichord, violin-solo, strings.
1992 Concerto No. 2 for violin-solo with orchestra (in one part) 
The orchestra: 1,1,1,0; triangle, strings (10-12; 8-10; 6–8; 4–6; 2).
1993 Concerto in Romantic Style (Концерт в романтическом стиле) for viola and string orchestra (in one movement), Op. 102
The orchestra: viola-solo, strings: (8; 6; 6; 6; 2).
The works for organ
1985 Concerto No. 1 for organ “Cassandra” in four parts
1988 Symphony for reciter “Chernobyl” in two parts: 1. “Zone”, 2. “Quo vadis”
1988 Concerto No. 2 for organ. Polyphonic notebook in four parts.
1989 Concerto No. 3 for organ in four parts: 1.“Reflections”, 2.“Moving”, 3.”Choral”, 4.”Walking in C-Major”.
1995 Ten chorales for organ (“Imitation of Old Masters”). Dedicated to the Spanish Infanta Helen
Chamber-instrumental works
1953 Nine little novels for piano
1953 “Fleetingnesses” for piano
1953 Sonata for French horn and piano
1954 Trio No. 1 for piano, violin and cello
1955 Trio No. 2 for piano, violin and cello
1986 “Moods” – 24 pieces for piano
Chamber-vocal works
1955 Three romances to the verses by A. Isaakjan
1. "A Plucked Rose has no Way Home"
2. "Grave"
3. "I Always Remember..."
1956 Three sonnets by Shakespeare
1. "Mossy Marble of Stone Graves"
2. "Oh, How Shall I Praise You"
3. "Jaded by Toils"
1956 Three songs to the verses by V. Orlov 
1. Familiar song
2. Golden Twilight
3. A song over the telephone
1957 "Water-colours" – vocal cycle to the verses by medieval Japanese poets
1. Struck the road
2. The way to the capital
3. Before the execution
4. In the morning mist
5. Dream
1958 Vocal cycle to the verses by V. Mayakovsky
1. Could you..? 
2. Something about Petersburg
3. Tricks of cloud
4. Listen! 
5. Instead of a letter
1959 Three songs to the verses by S. Davydova
1. A song about pigeons
2. A road song
3. A song about spring
1960 "Garden Ring" to the verses by S. Grebennikov and H. Dobronravov
1960 "Your Eyes Look Like New Car Headlights" to the verses by S. Kirsanov
1960 Three romances to the verses by S. Kirsanov
1. Your pictures
2. Round a white clothed table
3. Come!
1961 It so happens to the verses by B. Gaikovich
1962 Vocal cycle to the verses by L. Martynov
1. Night was falling
2. Water
3. Leaves
1963 Two songs to the verses by N. Dobronravov
1. Don't be sad
2. In the evenings
1963 Vocal cycle to the verses by Bella Akhmadulina
1. An old romance
2. I thought you were a doctor for me
3. Fifteen boys
1964 Vocal cycle to the verses by Evgeny Vinokurov
1. I was seizing sentiments
2. Windows
3. Your face is fading from my memory
1964 "Skirls" – vocal cycle to the verses by M. Malishevsky
1. Sparrow – experimenter
2. Monkey and mirror
3. Self-respect
4. Critics and bubbles
5. Conversation
6. In a rook-like way
7. Nightingale and art counsel
1965 "Music" to the verses by V. Orlov
1966 "You are going away like a train" to the verses by E. Evtushenko
1967 Seven song-recitatives to the verses by G. Pozhenjan
1. I am such a tree
2. Dolphins
3. It's birds' manner to fly away
4. Pine-trees
5. I would like ... 
6. I took a decision
7. Soon you will be grown up
1967 "Farewell to Arms" - vocal cycle to the verses by E. Hemingway
1. Footfall
2. Way? 
3. Along wet earth
4. Killed
5. Did it ever happen to you? 
6. How night differs from day? 
7. Praise to Christmas
8. We are spending what is not destined for it
9. Love and compassion
10. I rushed to you
11. We carry love within us
12. Ever alive
1968 "Little Prince" to the verses by N. Dobronravov
1969 Six vocal novels to the verses by L. Ashkenazi
1. Radio
2. Women
3. Cigarettes
4. I told her exactly this
5. Light steam
6. A song about new generation
1970 Songs to the verses by A. Voznesensky
1. I want silence
2. Grove
3. Shall I stare at the train? 
4. Memory ("They Killed Poem")
5. I am heading from the carriage platform
1971 Two romances to the verses by M. Tsvetaeva
1. My darling, what have I done to you? 
2. Attempt at jealousy
1971 "I am Writing to You" to the verses by M. Lermontov
1972 Two songs to the verses by R. Rozhdestvensky
1. Instants
2. A song about remote Motherland
1974 Six songs to the verses by Soviet poets
1. I like it (M. Tsvetaeva) 
2. No one will be at home (B. Posternak) 
3. At the mirror (M. Tsvetaeva) 
4. That's what happened to me (E. Evtushenko) 
5. I asked an ash-tree (V. Kirchov) 
6. Along my street (Bella Akhmadulina B. Akhmadulina)
1974 Vocal cycle to the verses by L. Martynov
1. Night was falling
2. Water
3. Leaves
1974 Vocal cycle to the verses by A. Voznesensky
1. I want silence
2. Grove
Shall I stare at the train?
1974 Vocal cycle to the verses by M. Tsvetaeva
1975 Memory  to the verses by D. Samoilov
1975 Don't disappear to the verses by A. Voznesensky
1975 Vocal cycle to the verses by S. Kirsanov
1. Your eyes
2. Your pictures
3. At the white clothed table
4. Come
1976 We are, comrade, with you – cycle of songs to the verses by M. Svetlov
1. Red Guards from remote times
2. Old Komsomol members song
3. I was not a friend of hers
4. Moscow Military district
5. In the reconnaissance
6. Infantry passing the bogs
7. We are, comrade, with you
8. Grenada
1977 "Echo" ("Don't return to ex-beloved") to the verses by A. Voznesensky
1977 A song about circus to the verses by B. Akhmadulina
1977 Old Komsomol members' songs to the verses by M. Svetlov
1. Red Guards from remote times
2. Old Komsomol members' song
3. I was not a friend of hers
4. Moscow Military district
5. In the reconnaissance
6. Infantry passing the bogs
7. We are, comrade, with you
8. Grenada
1979 "Remember this World". Vocal cycle to the verses by A. Voznesensky
1. Twilights are frequent over the ploughed field
2. Nostalgia for the present
3. Thanks for not dying yesterday
4. Remember this world
1980 Eight sonnets by Shakespeare
1. I love
2. Sonnet about a hen
3. I am guilty
4. Alas! My verse is not sparkling new
5. Sonnet about an apple
6. Love is blind and blinds us too
7. To prevent two hearts' union
8. Ardent heard at the dawn ... 
1986 Five songs to the verses by M. Tsvetaeva
1. Where has such tenderness come from?
2. And again the window
3. Island girl
4. I don't need you anymore
5. Should I forget it?
Music for theatre performance
1963 “Purpose” (Sovremennik)
1966 “Farewell to Arms” (Lenin's Komsomol theatre)
1966 “The Hero of our Time” (Theatre on the Taganka)
1968 “Farewell” (Mossoviet theatre)
1968 “Climbing the Fudzijama” (Sovremennik)

Filmography 
1957 “Our Fathers' Youth"
1958 “Save the Drowning Man”
1959 “Ten Steps to the East”
1961 “A Man Following the Sun”
1961 “My Junior Brother”
1962 “Goodbye! Boys”
1962 “Welcome, or No Trespassing”
1963 “The Big Ore”
1964 "To love”
1965 “Farewell
1966 “Wake up Mukhin”
1966 “The Last Swindler”
1967 “Save the Drowning Man”
1968 “King-deer”
1968 “Passenger from the "Equator"”
1970 “Fixed-post Spy's Fate”
1972 “Seventeen Moments of Spring” (12 series)
1974 “Star Minute”
1974 “The Irony of Fate”
1975 “Olga Sergeevna” (8 series)
1976 “Disappeared Expedition” (2 series)
1978 “Out-of-date Comedy”
1980 “Adam Merries Eve” (2 series)
1989 “Endhouse Mysteries”
1990 “Monster”
1990 “Homonovus”
1991 “And the Wind Returns”
1993 “Russian Ragtime”
1995 “Summer People” (“Dachniki”)
Works for musical theatre
1945 “On the Beach” - ballet in one act. Libretto by Shengelaja.
1945 “Interrogation” - ballet in one act. Libretto by G. Gelovani.
1965 “Who are you?” (opera for young people). Libretto by M. Churova on the motives of V. Aksenov's novel “Mandarines from Morocco” to the verses by A. Voznesensky, E. Vinokurov, E. Evtushenko, G. Pozhenjan, R. Rozhdestvensky, S. Kirsanov, M. L'vovsky. 
The orchestra: piano 1, harpsichord (piano 2), ionika, elektroorga celesta, vibraphone, xylophone, elektro guitar 1, elektro guitar 2, batteria, double-basses.
1973 “Poem about happiness” – ballet in two acts. Libretto by V. Zakharov.
1981 “Count Kaliostro” – opera-buff. Libretto by N. Kemarsky to the motives of the same name novel by A. Tolstoy to the verses by A. Kemarsky and R. Sef. 
The orchestra: 1,1,1,1; 2,1,1,0, vibraphone, xylophone, side drum, bass drum, whip, triangle, cymbals, harp, harpsichord, strings.
1985 “Gernika” – ballet in two acts to the motives P. Picasso's picture. 
The orchestra: 1,1,1,1; 1,1,1,1; bells, xylophone, vibraphone, triangle, tambourine, tam-tam, bass drum, cymbals, harp, piano, strings.
1986 “Waiting” – mono-opera. 
(There are two versions of the opera: for lyric soprano and for mezzo-soprano.) 
The orchestra: 1,1,0,1; 0,0,0,0; vibraphone, (xylophone), bells, triangle, tam-tam, kettle drums, harp, voice, strings.
1986 “Girl and Death” – ballet in two acts to the motives of M. Gorky's tale. 
The orchestra: 2,2,2,2; 4(F), 3(B),3,1; kettle drums, chime-bells, xylophone, vibraphone, triangle, tambourine, side drum, castanets, cymbals, tam-tam, harp, piano, strings.
1992 “Figarienok's Marriage” – opera-grotesque to the motives of Bomarsher's work.

Books
«Я просто живу» (I Am Simply Living), autobiography, Moscow, Zebra, 2007

References

External links
 Tariverdiev International Organ Competition
 Tariverdiev.ru
 Tariverdiev at Lib.ru
 
 Tariverdiev

1931 births
1996 deaths
20th-century classical composers
Armenian composers
Georgian people of Armenian descent
Russian opera composers
Soviet opera composers
Male opera composers
Musicians from Tbilisi
People's Artists of Russia
Russian people of Armenian descent
Russian male classical composers
Soviet classical composers
Soviet film score composers
Male film score composers
Recipients of the USSR State Prize
Recipients of the Nika Award
Gnessin State Musical College alumni
20th-century Russian male musicians